The 1993 NCAA Division I men's ice hockey tournament involved 12 schools playing in single-elimination play to determine the national champion of men's  NCAA Division I college ice hockey. It began on March 26, 1993, and ended with the championship game on April 3. A total of 11 games were played.

Qualifying teams
The at-large bids and seeding for each team in the tournament were announced after the conference tournaments concluded. The Western Collegiate Hockey Association (WCHA) had four teams receive a berth, the Central Collegiate Hockey Association (CCHA) and the ECAC each had three teams receive a berth in the tournament while the Hockey East had two berths.

Game locations
 East Regional – Centrum in Worcester, Worcester, Massachusetts
 West Regional – Joe Louis Arena, Detroit
 Frozen Four – Bradley Center, Milwaukee

Tournament bracket

Note: * denotes overtime period(s)

Regional Quarterfinals

East Regional

(3) Harvard vs. (6) Northern Michigan

(4) Clarkson vs. (5) Minnesota

West Regional

(3) Miami vs. (6) Wisconsin

(4) Minnesota-Duluth vs. (5) Brown

Regional semifinals

East Regional

(1) Maine vs. (5) Minnesota

(2) Boston University vs. (6) Northern Michigan

West Regional

(1) Lake Superior State vs. (4) Minnesota-Duluth

(2) Michigan vs. (6) Wisconsin

Frozen Four

National semifinal

(E1) Maine vs. (W2) Michigan

(E2) Boston University vs. (W1) Lake Superior State

National Championship

(E1) Maine vs. (W1) Lake Superior State

All-Tournament team
G: Garth Snow (Maine)
D: Chris Imes (Maine)
D: Michael Smith (Lake Superior State)
F: Paul Kariya (Maine)
F: Jim Montgomery* (Maine)
F: Brian Rolston (Lake Superior State)
* Most Outstanding Player(s)

Record by conference

References

Tournament
NCAA Division I men's ice hockey tournament
NCAA Division I men's ice hockey tournament
NCAA Division I men's ice hockey tournament
NCAA Division I men's ice hockey tournament
NCAA Division I men's ice hockey tournament
NCAA Division I men's ice hockey tournament
NCAA Division I men's ice hockey tournament
1990s in Milwaukee
Ice hockey competitions in Worcester, Massachusetts
Ice hockey competitions in Detroit
Ice hockey competitions in Wisconsin
Sports competitions in Milwaukee